Guilherme Franco (born November 25, 1946 and died November 12, 2016 in São Paulo, Brazil) was a percussionist in the jazz and world fusion music genres.

Franco performed on the albums of many notable jazz musicians such as McCoy Tyner, Lonnie Liston Smith, Don Pullen and Woody Shaw. Between 1971 and 1976 he was an occasional additional member of Keith Jarrett's "American Quartet", and was also a member of Paul Winter's Consort.

In 1981 he started a samba school in New York City and a power samba group called "Pe De Boi" (a Brazilian slang term for a good musician, literally meaning "foot of the bull"). As a result, he began playing many gigs in the New York City underground scene of the 1980s with the likes of David Byrne and David Johansen among many others.

He was said to practice music 14 hours a day.

Franco suffered a stroke in March 2015 and was cared for at the Hospital Arnaldo Pezzuti Cavalcanti in Mogi das Cruzes, São Paulo where he died in November 2016.

Discography
In 1998 he recorded the solo album Capoeira: Legendary Music of Brazil, on the Lyrichord record label, on which album he plays most of the instruments.

He appeared on at least one album a year in most years after 1972, as shown in the table below.

References

External links
 Guilherme Franco at YouTube
 

Brazilian percussionists
Brazilian drummers
Brazilian jazz musicians
1946 births
2016 deaths
Paul Winter Consort members